Youssoufia (Berber: ⵢⵓⵙⵓⴼⵉⵢⴰ, Arabic: اليوسفية) is the capital of Youssoufia Province in Marrakesh-Safi, Morocco. In the 2014 Moroccan census it recorded a population of 67,628, up from 64,518 ten years ago.

It is known for its phosphate production. The city was founded in 1931 by the French when they began to exploit the phosphate deposits of the Gantour basin.

People
 Ismahane Elouafi,  geneticist,  was born here in 1971.
 Samir Sarsare, a football player.

References

Populated places in Youssoufia Province
1931 establishments in Morocco
Youssoufia, Morocco